Berndt Sköldestig, 1944–2006, is a Swedish social democratic politician, member of the Riksdag 1998–2006. Sköldestg died in 2006.

References

Members of the Riksdag from the Social Democrats
2006 deaths
1944 births
Members of the Riksdag 2002–2006
Members of the Riksdag 1998–2002
20th-century Swedish politicians
21st-century Swedish politicians